Wayne Thomas Satz (January 10, 1945 – December 24, 1992) was a reporter who first reported on the McMartin preschool trial. His first McMartin broadcast aired on KABC-TV in Los Angeles on February 2, 1984.

Satz presented an unchallenged view of the children's and parents' claims. During the case, Satz became personally involved when he entered into a romantic relationship with Kee MacFarlane, the social worker at the Children's Institute International, who was interviewing the children.  Satz did not reveal the relationship, and continued reporting the unchallenged claims.

Satz died in 1992, at age 47, from a heart attack.  He was found dead in his Studio City, Los Angeles home.

References

External links
 

American male journalists
20th-century American journalists
1945 births
1992 deaths
Television anchors from Los Angeles
People from Studio City, Los Angeles